St David's Church is a Grade II* listed medieval church in the Welsh village of Llanddewi Brefi, 3 miles south of Tregaron in the county of Ceredigion.

History 

The church was founded in 1187, built on the site where a famous synod was held in the sixth century. According to local legend, it is said that during this synod, which St David addressed, the flat ground rose into a mound beneath his feet, allowing him to be better seen and heard by the vast crowd that had gathered to hear him speak. The church supposedly stands on that same mound. It's possible that, in reality, it was built on the site of a Bronze Age barrow.

The earliest Welsh translation of Rhygyfarch's "Life of St, David", Llyf Ancr Llanddewi Brefi, was written here in 1346 by an Anchorite, and is now kept in the Bodleian Library at Oxford.

The central tower dates from the 12th century, which, in medieval times, had five bells in its belfry. Today there is only one bell, which was given to the church by John Inglis Jones of Derry Ormond in 1874. The 12th century nave and chancel were taken down in 1832, being beyond repair, and replaced for the sum of £285 in 1833–34. The new building was of poor quality, however, and the nave as it stands today was rebuilt for £1,100 in 1874, and the Chancel in 1886 for £530.

Contents 
The church contains a number of items of historical significance, including an Ogham inscribed stone which stands in the tower, that was perhaps the tombstone of a Pelagian Christian. Another is the Idnert Stone, of which only two-fifths exists today, as it was broken up in the 19th century to repair the nave's west wall. Fortunately, Edward Lluyd, having seen the Idnert Stone in 1698, made a copy of it, which reads:"hic iacet idnert filivs iacobi qui occisvs fvit propter predam sancti david"["Here lies Idnert son of Jacobus who was slain because of the plunder of the Sanctuary of David"]An Ox horn was kept in the Chancel for several centuries, the remains of which are now kept at the Welsh Folk Museum, St Fagans. There are two traditions linked to the horn, the first of which is told in the following Welsh verse:"Llanddewi Brefi fraith,Lle brefodd yr ŷch naw gwaithNes hollti Craif y Foelallt."["Mottled-hued Llanddewi Brefi,Where the ox lowed nine times,Splitting open Foelallt's rock."]The story goes that one of two oxen employed to carry stones to build the church died from being overworked, at which point the other bellowed nine times, its cries so loud and mournful that Foelallt Hill was consequently split open. The second tradition claims the horn came from a monster, "the plague of the country", which was vanquished by St David.

References

Llanddewi Brefi, St David